Raschau-Markersbach is a municipality in the district of Erzgebirgskreis in Saxony, Germany. It was formed on 1 January 2008, by the merger of the former municipalities Markersbach and Raschau.

Gallery

References 

Erzgebirgskreis